The Château Saint-Jean is a castle in the commune of Nogent-le-Rotrou in the Eure-et-Loir département of France.

History
Château Saint-Jean, which overlooks the roads from Chartres to Le Mans and from Châteaudun to Bellême from the plateau on which its stands, was built in several stages. It was built in the 1040s, making it one of the oldest keeps of this type still standing in France. The circular enclosure and the towers date from the end of the 12th century and the beginning of the 13th century. A dry moat crossed by a drawbridge and the slope of the terrain to the west completed the defensive system. Between the 15th and the 16th centuries, several constructions gave the castle a more residential function, while the keep was abandoned.

Without a garrison from the 17th century, the castle served as a prison during the French Revolution, before being sold to individuals. Purchased by the town in 1950 and partially restored between 2000 and 2004, the castle has housed the municipal museum since 1959. The 155 "Saint-Jean steps" (marches Saint-Jean) connect the castle to the Paty district, where several Renaissance mansions remain.

Protection
It was registered  as an historical monument by the French Ministry of Culture in 1948 and 1950 and protected in 1952.

See also
 List of châteaux in Eure-et-Loir
 List of castles in France

References

External links

 Ministry of Culture listing and photos for Château Saint-Jean 

Saint-Jean
Castles in Centre-Val de Loire
Historic house museums in Centre-Val de Loire
Museums in Eure-et-Loir
Chateau Saint-Jean
Monuments of the Centre des monuments nationaux

fr:Nogent-le-Rotrou#Château Saint-Jean